Laadla may refer to:

 Laadla, Saare County, Estonia
 Laadla (1966 film), a Hindi film
 Laadla (1994 film), an Indian Hindi film